Dia Davina is a slam poetry artist based in Vancouver, British Columbia (Coast Salish territory). They are queer and genderqueer and use they/them/their pronouns.

Life

Dia Davina was born in Ontario, in 1987 or 1988 but grew up in the Middle East, mainly Egypt and Lebanon. Their parents are teachers. Their dad is Austrian. They have three siblings. They studied sociology at the University of British Columbia. They have a close relationship with their younger brother who is the subject of Davina's first slam reading titled Blue Jay Ice cream.

Davina has a self-proclaimed love of Bowties.

Career

Dia Davina has been writing their entire life but their slam poetry career began in 2012 when they attended their first poetry slam in Vancouver. The experience stayed with them, and soon after they wrote and performed a piece for a friend's birthday. It was very well received and since then Davina has been on slam tours and facilitated workshops on writing and performing poetry. They compete internationally.

Style

Their work is often classified as queer poetry. They have performed at pride festivities across Canada. Davina describes that their poetry attempts to "bring honesty, and vulnerability and truth".

Awards and recognition

Davina won 4th place at the 2014 Canadian Individual Poetry Slam Championship, first place at the 
2013 Annual Queer Poetry Slam at Café Deux Soleils, first place at the 2014 UVic Diversity Writing Contest – Spoken Word category 2014  and third place at the 2014 Women of the World Poetry Slam Playoffs.

"Dia Davina is a poet who is able to stare in to the dark corners of our hearts and find the light. Dia can make us squirm with their words in the best ways possible and then offer release with a tear or a laugh. Plus they’re just a lot of fun to watch on stage!" -RC Weslowski, 2012 Canadian Individual Poetry Slam Champion, 2 time World Cup of Poetry Slam Finalist  see: Canadian Festival of Spoken Word

References

21st-century Canadian poets
Canadian spoken word poets
People with non-binary gender identities
Living people
Writers from Ontario
1987 births
Slam poets
Canadian LGBT poets
Non-binary artists
Canadian non-binary writers
21st-century Canadian LGBT people